A ridesharing company (also known as a transportation network company, ride-hailing service; the vehicles are called app-taxis or e-taxis) is a company that, via websites and mobile apps, matches passengers with drivers of vehicles for hire that, unlike taxicabs, cannot legally be hailed from the street.

The legality of ridesharing companies by jurisdiction varies; in some areas they have been banned and are considered to be illegal taxicab operations. Regulations can include requirements for driver background checks, fares, caps on the number of drivers in an area, insurance, licensing, and minimum wage.

Terminology: ridesharing vs. ridehailing
The term "ridesharing" has been used by many international news sources, including The Washington Post, CNN, BBC News, The New York Times, the Associated Press, and the Los Angeles Times. Groups representing drivers, including Rideshare Drivers United and The Rideshare Guy (Harry Campbell), also use the term "rideshare", since "hailing" rideshare cars from the street is illegal. Usage is inconsistent, with the same publication or the same article sometimes using both "ridesharing" and "ridehailing".

In January 2015, the Associated Press Stylebook, the authority that sets many of the news industry's grammar and word use standards, officially adopted the term "ride-hailing" to describe the services offered by these companies, claiming that "ridesharing" doesn't accurately describe the services since not all rides are shared, and "ride-sourcing" only is accurate when drivers provide rides for income. While the Associated Press recommended the use of "ride-hailing" as a term, it noted that, unlike taxicabs, ridesharing companies cannot pick up street hails.

History
Carpooling was popular in the mid-1970s due to the 1973 oil crisis and the 1979 energy crisis. The first employee carpools/vanpools were organized then at Chrysler and 3M.

In the 1990s, carpooling was popular among college students, where campuses have limited parking space. The feasibility of further development of carpooling was investigated although the comprehensive technologies were not commercially available yet at the time.

Ridesharing programs began migrating to the Internet in the late 1990s.

A 2006 report by the Federal Transit Administration stated that "next day" responsiveness has been achieved but that "dynamic" ridematching has not yet been successfully implemented.

In 2009, Uber was founded as Ubercab by Garrett Camp, a computer programmer and the co-founder of StumbleUpon, and Travis Kalanick, who sold his Red Swoosh startup for $19 million in 2007.

In 2011, Sidecar launched; its founder Sunil Paul patented the idea of hailing a ride via mobile app in 2002.

Lyft was launched in the summer of 2012 by computer programmers Logan Green and John Zimmer as a service of Zimride, an intercity carpooling company they founded in 2007.

Careem began operations in July 2012.

In 2013, California became the first state to regulate such companies; they are regulated as public utilities by the California Public Utilities Commission and the legal term used is "transportation network company" (TNC).

Driver classification and earnings
Unless otherwise required by law, ridesharing companies have classified drivers as independent contractors and not employees under employment law, arguing that they receive certain flexibilities not generally received by employees. This affects taxation, working time, employee benefits, unemployment benefits, and overtime benefits and has been challenged legally.

Jurisdictions in which drivers must receive the classification of "employees" include the United Kingdom (after the case of Aslam v Uber BV which was decided by the Supreme Court of the United Kingdom), Switzerland, New Jersey, and the Netherlands. California Assembly Bill 5 (2019) was passed to force drivers to be classified as employees in California, although ridesharing companies received an exemption by 2020 California Proposition 22, a ballot initiative. Ridesharing companies spent tens of millions of dollars on the campaign.

Some drivers earn rates that are below minimum wage; as a result, in some jurisdictions, laws were passed to guarantee drivers a minimum wage before and after expenses.

Effect on taxis

Values of taxi medallions, transferable permits or licenses authorizing the holder to pick up passengers for hire, have declined in value significantly. A couple of credit unions that lent money secured by medallions suffered from bank failure. Taxi companies have sued ridesharing companies for various reasons, including allegedly operating illegal taxicab operations on the fact that Uber knew its drivers were not properly licensed and did not have proper accreditation. Uber adopted a program to avoid enforcement activities, and as a result had an unfair competitive advantage against taxi and hire-car operators and drivers who did comply with the law. No case by taxis against Uber has ended with a judgment in favor of the taxis, with most cases resulting in settlement or courts ruling for Uber. and the only case proceeding to trial resulting in a full verdict for Uber.

Ride sharing platforms have a substantial impact on the taxi industry. A study found that while some taxi drivers have lost income due to Uber, Uber has created more jobs than it has destroyed. It also found that Uber drivers on average spend a higher fraction of their time, and drive a substantially higher share of miles, with a passenger in the car compared to drivers in traditional taxi services, likely due to Uber optimizing their pairing algorithm.

Criticism

Safety issues
Crimes have been committed by rideshare drivers as well as by individuals posing as rideshare drivers who lure unsuspecting passengers to their vehicles by placing an emblem on their car or by claiming to be a passenger's expected driver. The latter led to the murder of Samantha Josephson and the introduction of Sami’s Law. Ridesharing companies have been accused of not taking necessary measures to prevent sexual assault. They have been fined by government agencies for violations in their background check processes.

Ridesharing has also been criticized for encouraging or requiring phone use while driving. To accept a fare, some apps require drivers to tap their phone screen, usually within 15 seconds after receiving a notification, which is illegal in some jurisdictions since it could result in distracted driving.

Ridesharing vehicles in many cities routinely obstruct bicycle lanes while picking up or dropping off passengers, a practice that endangers cyclists.

Price fixing allegations
In the United States, drivers do not have any control over the fares they charge; lawsuits allege that this is an illegal restraint on trade in violation of the Sherman Antitrust Act of 1890. Rideshare companies have argued that they only connect riders and drivers, set service terms, and collect fares. This is the subject of Gill et al v. Uber Technologies, Inc. et al, a lawsuit filed in California.

Insufficient accessibility
Ridesharing has been criticized for providing inadequate accessibility measures for disabled people, in violation of local laws.

In some areas, vehicle for hire companies are required by law to have a certain amount of wheelchair accessible vans (WAVs) in use. However, most drivers do not own a WAV, making it hard to comply with the laws.

While ridesharing companies require drivers to transport service animals, drivers have been criticized for refusal to transport service animals, which, in the United States, is in violation of the Americans with Disabilities Act. In 2021, an arbitrator awarded $1.1 million to a visually impaired passenger who travels with a guide dog because she was denied rides 14 separate times.

Bias against passengers in certain demographic groups
Complaints that drivers have not accepted ride requests from passengers in certain demographic groups has led some ridesharing companies to hide passenger identities until the ride request is accepted by the driver. A 2018 study in Washington, D.C. found that drivers cancelled ride requests from African Americans and LGBT and straight ally passengers (indicated by a rainbow flag) more often, but cancelled at the same rate for women and men. The higher cancellation rate for African American passengers was somewhat attenuated at peak times, when financial incentives were higher.

Traffic congestion
Studies have shown that especially in cities where it competes with public transport, ridesharing contributes to traffic congestion, reduces public transport use, and has no substantial impact on vehicle ownership and increases automobile dependency. 

Dead mileage specifically causes unnecessary carbon emissions and traffic congestion. A study published in September 2019 found that taxicabs had lower rider waiting time and vehicle empty driving time, and thus contribute less to congestion and pollution in downtown areas. However, a 2018 report noted that ridesharing complements public transit. A study published in July 2018 found that Uber and Lyft are creating more traffic and congestion. A study published in March 2016 found that in Los Angeles and Seattle the passenger occupancy for Uber services is higher than that of taxi services, and concluded that Uber rides reduce congestion on the premise that they replace taxi rides. Studies citing data from 2010 to 2019 found that Uber rides are made in addition to taxi rides, and replace walking, bike rides, and bus rides, in addition to the Uber vehicles having a low average occupancy rate, all of which increases congestion. This increase in congestion has led some cities to levy taxes on rides taken with ridesharing companies.

A study published in July 2017 indicated that the increase in traffic caused by Uber generates collective costs in lost time in congestion, increased pollution, and increased accident risks that can exceed the economy and revenue generated by the service, indicating that, in certain conditions, Uber might have a social cost that is greater than its benefits.

See also
 Hitchhiking and slugging, also known as casual carpooling
 Peer-to-peer economy
 Carsharing, which allows consumer to access automobiles for self-driven journeys
 Peer-to-peer carsharing, where customers drive themselves in cars rented from individual owners
 Carpool
 Vanpool
 Demand responsive transport
 Flexible carpooling
 Illegal taxicab operation
 Mobility as a service
 Rideshare advertising
 Ride sharing privacy
 Sharing economy
 Sustainable transport
 Spaceflight, Inc. - rocket rideshare service

References

 
Transport culture